James Goodson (1818 – 14 May 1895) was a British Conservative Party politician and railways director.

Goodson was elected Conservative MP for Great Yarmouth at the 1865 general election and held the seat until 1868 until it was disenfranchised under the Reform Act 1867 for corruption.

Between 1863 and 1866, Goodson was a chairman of the Great Eastern Railway Company, and in February 1879, he became director of the Milford Docks Company.

References

1818 births
1895 deaths
UK MPs 1865–1868
Conservative Party (UK) MPs for English constituencies